Glyoxysomes are specialized peroxisomes found in plants (particularly in the fat storage tissues of germinating seeds) and also in filamentous fungi.  Seeds that contain fats and oils include corn, soybean, sunflower, peanut and pumpkin.  As in all peroxisomes, in glyoxysomes the fatty acids are oxidized to acetyl-CoA by peroxisomal β-oxidation enzymes.  When the fatty acids are oxidized hydrogen peroxide (H2O2) is produced as oxygen (O2) is consumed.  Thus the seeds need oxygen to germinate.  Besides peroxisomal functions, glyoxysomes possess additionally the key enzymes of glyoxylate cycle (isocitrate lyase and malate synthase) which accomplish the glyoxylate cycle bypass. 

Thus, glyoxysomes (as all peroxisomes) contain enzymes that initiate the breakdown of fatty acids and additionally possess the enzymes to produce intermediate products for the synthesis of sugars by gluconeogenesis. The seedling uses these sugars synthesized from fats until it is mature enough to produce them by photosynthesis.

Plant peroxisomes also participate in photorespiration and nitrogen metabolism in root nodules.

References

External links 
 Sengbusch, Peter V. (2003) Botany online: Peroxysomes and Glyoxysomes
 UniProt Knowledgebase keyword: Glyoxysome
 

Organelles